The Orange Blossom Special was a deluxe passenger train on the Seaboard Air Line Railroad connecting railroads between New York City and Miami in the United States. It ran during the winter season only.

It covered  on the Pennsylvania Railroad from New York City to Washington, D.C.,  the Richmond, Fredericksburg and Potomac Railroad from Washington to Richmond, and the Seaboard Air Line Railroad from Richmond via Raleigh, Columbia, and Savannah to Miami.  A section also went to Tampa and St. Petersburg.

History
The train started on November 21, 1925, and was the brainchild of SAL president S. Davies Warfield, who wanted to capitalize on booming development in Florida at the time. Warfield believed Florida was a land of opportunity, and with fast, luxurious trains he could lure influential (not to mention wealthy) business leaders to the Sunshine State. In February 1926 the train took 35 hours to run from New York to West Palm Beach (Seaboard track did not reach Miami until 1927).

Spurred by the success of Henry Flagler and his rival Florida East Coast Railway in attracting travelers, the Orange Blossom Special became famous in its own right.
It was renowned for its speed and luxury.  E. M. Frimbo, "The World's Greatest Railway Buff", offered this account of a dining car chef who had worked aboard the train: 

The service was suspended during World War II to free the equipment up for carrying troops. Its last run was in 1953. This west Florida market is now handled by Amtrak's Silver Star.

In early 2012, a similar locomotive painted to resemble a locomotive of the time, and lettered Orange Blossom Special was moved in from its long-time display location at the Church Street Station in Orlando, Florida, to the Florida Railroad Museum in nearby Tampa. Plans are for a multi-year restoration to active status for eventual excursion service.

The train and the song 

It happened during the maiden run of the new streamlined train at the Jacksonville Seaboard Railroad Station that Ervin T. Rouse and Robert Russell "Chubby" Wise saw this train. Rouse and Wise wrote the Orange Blossom Special song as a fiddle tune. The tune was first recorded by Ervin and his brother Gordon one year later in New York. Bill Monroe recorded Rouse's and Wise's tune in 1942 (with Art Wooten on fiddle) and popularized the tune. Johnny Cash named his 1965 album after the song. The song was also recorded by Bill Ramsey and Don Paulin.

This popular tale explains the fascination which led Ervin Rouse and Robert "Chubby" Wise to write the now famous fiddle tune. However, historically the Blossom was never "streamlined" and used Pullman heavyweight sleepers, diners, and some coaches of the winter Tampa run. The Blossom may have used some lightweight cars sporadically in mixed consist with the Pennsylvania Railroad which hauled the Blossom in the Northeast Corridor. If Rouse and Wise did see a streamlined Seaboard train in 1938, it was most likely the Silver Meteor which was streamlined with its stainless steel coaches.  The name of this train was chosen by a public contest.  The Seaboard's lightweight trains later became known as the Silver Fleet.  This included the Silver Meteor, the Silver Star and the Silver Comet.  The train did receive modern EMC E4 diesel locomotives in 1938, but continued using heavyweight Pullmans and coaches until its demise in 1953. It is also possible the songwriters saw one of the Twin Cities Zephyrs at the Jacksonville railroad station in 1935.  The Chicago, Burlington and Quincy Railroad brought the train to Florida at the invitation of the Seaboard Railroad.  It toured the state, making stops in both east and west coast Florida cities, where the public was able to both view and tour the Zephyr; Jacksonville was one of the stops on its Florida tour.

Accident
On January 11, 1949 at Bay Lake, Florida, the Orange Blossom Special had an overheated bearing on a traction motor on the Diesel locomotive, which seized up and caused a derailment. There was one death and 76 injured. Twenty days later at Rock, Michigan, a similar accident would happen on the Peninsula 400, which also had an overheated bearing on a failed traction motor that caused a derailment. There was one death and 15 injured.

References

Further reading

External links 

 Shrady, Theodore and Waldrop, Arthur M.: Orange Blossom Special: The Story of Florida's Distinguished Winter Train. (Valrico, FL: Atlantic Coast Line and Seaboard Air Line Railroads Historical Society, Inc., 1996).   
 Whitaker, Rogers E. M. and Hiss, Tony: All Aboard With E. M. Frimbo (Kodansha International, 1997).  
 Orange Blossom Special lyrics, song history, free download & fiddle tab links
 1941 schedule

Passenger trains of the Seaboard Air Line Railroad
Named passenger trains of the United States
North American streamliner trains
Railway services introduced in 1925
Night trains of the United States
Railway services discontinued in 1953